The 1994 Seattle Seahawks season was the team's 19th season with the National Football League (NFL). The 1994 season was head coach Tom Flores' last with the team.  The team played their two preseason and first three regular season home games at Husky Stadium due to the collapse of four ceiling tiles at the Kingdome on July 19.

Chris Warren and the Seahawks rushing attack ranked second best for the season.

Offseason

NFL Draft

Undrafted free agents

Personnel

Staff

Final roster

     Starters in bold.
 (*) Denotes players that were selected for the 1995 Pro Bowl.

Schedule

Preseason

Regular season
By finishing in fifth place in 1993, Seattle plays the two NFC fifth-place finishers, the Redskins and Buccaneers, and two games against the other AFC fifth-place finisher, the Colts.

Bold indicates division opponents.
Source: 1994 NFL season results

Standings

Game Summaries

Preseason

Week P1: at Indianapolis Colts

Week P2: vs. Tampa Bay Buccaneers

Week P3: vs. Minnesota Vikings

Week P4: at San Francisco 49ers

Regular season

Week 1: at Washington Redskins

Week 2: at Los Angeles Raiders

Week 3: vs. San Diego Chargers

Week 4: vs. Pittsburgh Steelers

Week 5: at Indianapolis Colts

Week 6: vs. Denver Broncos

Week 8: at Kansas City Chiefs

Week 9: at San Diego Chargers

Week 10: vs. Cincinnati Bengals

Week 11 at Denver Broncos

Week 12: vs. Tampa Bay Buccaneers

Week 13: vs. Kansas City Chiefs

Week 14: vs. Indianapolis Colts

Week 15: at Houston Oilers

Week 16: vs. Los Angeles Raiders

Week 17: at Cleveland Browns

References

External links
 Seahawks draft history at NFL.com
 1994 NFL season results at NFL.com

Seattle
Seattle Seahawks seasons
Seattle